Francisco Zamora Salinas  (October 28, 1939 – † April 8, 2002) was a famous footballer from El Salvador who played as a defender. He retired in 1973.

Club career
Born in Honduras, Zamora began his footballing career at Heligueras in Honduras and later transferred to Guatemalan powerhouse Municipal before coming to El Salvador where he spent his life there even becoming a Salvadoran citizen.

He first played for Municipal de Sonsonate before transferring to Salvadoran giants Alianza where he spent sixteen years there as both player (1964–1973) and assistant coach/reserve player (1974–1979) after which he retired and became a coach. As a player, he won the 1966 and 1967 league titles in a team also featuring players like José Quintanilla and Roberto Rivas.

Zamora went on to coach Platense, C.D. Vendaval, El Roble, San Nicolás de Tonacatepeque and Alianza.

International career
Nicknamed El Tigre, after becoming a Salvadoran citizen he went on to represent El Salvador.

Death
Zamora died of on April 8, 2002, aged 63. Zamora had four sons: Frank Zamora, Allan Zamora, Francisco Zamora Jr and Saúl Zamora and a daughter: Leslie Zamora.

References

External links
 El adiós a “el Tigre” - La Prensa Gráfica 

1939 births
2002 deaths
Naturalized citizens of El Salvador
Salvadoran people of Honduran descent
Association football midfielders
Honduran footballers
Salvadoran footballers
El Salvador international footballers
C.S.D. Municipal players
Alianza F.C. footballers
Honduran expatriate footballers
Expatriate footballers in Guatemala
Salvadoran football managers